Mount Chamberlin is a  mountain summit located west of the crest of the Sierra Nevada mountain range in Tulare County, California. Mt. Chamberlin ranks as the 119th highest summit in California. This mountain's name was officially adopted in 1940 by the U.S. Board on Geographic Names to honor American geologist Thomas Chrowder Chamberlin (1843–1928). The first ascent of the summit was made by Sierra Club member J. H. Czock, date unknown.

Climbing
Established climbing routes:
 South and West Slopes –  – 1932 by J.N. Holladay, E.M. Holladay, H.E. Fritsche
 East Ridge – class 3 – 1956 by George O. Hale
 North Pillar  – class 5.10 – 1979 by Galen Rowell, Mike Farrell 
 North Face – class 5.10d – 1983 by Claude Fiddler, Bob Harrington
 Eastern Pillar of the North Face – class 5.11 – 1992 by Julie Brugger, Andy de Klerk 
 Asleep at the Wheel – class 5.11 – 2001 by Jimmy Haden, Mike Pennings

Climate
According to the Köppen climate classification system, Mount Chamberlin has an alpine climate. Most weather fronts originate in the Pacific Ocean, and travel east toward the Sierra Nevada mountains. As fronts approach, they are forced upward by the peaks, causing them to drop their moisture in the form of rain or snowfall onto the range (orographic lift). Precipitation runoff from this mountain drains west to the Kern River via Whitney and Rock Creeks.

See also

 List of mountain peaks of California

References

External links
 Weather forecast: Mount Chamberlin

Mountains of Tulare County, California
Mountains of Sequoia National Park
North American 4000 m summits
Mountains of Northern California
Sierra Nevada (United States)